Hiroshi Fukuda (福田 弘, born May 27, 1942) is a retired Japanese weightlifter who won a silver medal at the 1963 World Championships. Next year he set a world record in the press and finished fourth at the 1964 Olympics.

References

1942 births
Living people
Olympic weightlifters of Japan
Weightlifters at the 1964 Summer Olympics
Japanese male weightlifters
20th-century Japanese people